The 2022 Vanderbilt Commodores football team represented Vanderbilt University in the 2022 NCAA Division I FBS football season. The Commodores played their home games at Vanderbilt Stadium in Nashville, Tennessee, and competed in the Eastern Division of the Southeastern Conference (SEC). They were led by second-year head coach Clark Lea.

Vanderbilt started the season off with a 2–0 record for the first time in four years.

Previous season

The 2021 team finished the season with a record of 2–10 record going 0–8 in their SEC games, finishing in last place in the East Division.

Schedule
Vanderbilt and the SEC announced the 2022 football schedule on September 21, 2021.

Coaching staff

Game summaries

at Hawaii

Statistics

Elon

Statistics

No. 23 Wake Forest

Statistics

at Northern Illinois

Statistics

at No. 2 Alabama

Statistics

No. 9 Ole Miss

Statistics

at No. 1 Georgia

Statistics

at Missouri

Statistics

South Carolina

Statistics

at No. 24 Kentucky

Statistics

Florida

Statistics

No. 10 Tennessee

Statistics

References

Vanderbilt
Vanderbilt Commodores football seasons
Vanderbilt Commodores football